The PDR Yemen Football Federation was the governing body of football in the People's Democratic Republic of Yemen, commonly known as South Yemen, and was responsible for organising the South Yemen national football team. The organisation was founded in 1940, but only became a FIFA member in 1967. In 1972, they also joined the Asian Football Confederation. The association folded in 1990 following Yemeni unification. The Yemen Football Association, considered the successor to North Yemen, subsequently took control of football in the region.

References

Football
Football in Yemen
Sports organizations established in 1940
1940 establishments in Asia
Organizations disestablished in 1990
1990 disestablishments in Yemen
South Yemen
Defunct association football governing bodies